The Philippine House Special Committee on the East ASEAN Growth Area is a special committee of the Philippine House of Representatives.

Jurisdiction 
As prescribed by House Rules, the committee's jurisdiction includes the following:
 Social, political, economic policies affecting the East ASEAN Growth Area
 Promotion of trade and investment among the bloc's four constituent countries: Brunei, Indonesia, Malaysia and the Philippines

Members, 18th Congress

Historical members

18th Congress

Chairperson 
 Rogelio Pacquiao (Sarangani–Lone, PDP–Laban) August 13, 2019 – October 13, 2020

See also 
 House of Representatives of the Philippines
 List of Philippine House of Representatives committees

References

External links 
House of Representatives of the Philippines

East ASEAN Growth Area